Bhuvanaikabahu V was King of Gampola who ruled from 1372/3 to 1391/2. He succeeded his uncle Vikramabahu III as King of Gampola and was succeeded by Vira Bahu II.

See also
 List of Sri Lankan monarchs
 History of Sri Lanka

References

External links
 Kings & Rulers of Sri Lanka
 Codrington's Short History of Ceylon

Monarchs of Gampola
House of Siri Sanga Bo
B
B